Wyatt James Copeland Jr. (March 5, 1945 – June 4, 2010) was an American football player and college athletics administrator.  He played as an offensive lineman for eight seasons in the National Football League (NFL).  Copeland was born in Charlottesville, Virginia in 1945 and attended the University of Virginia. He was drafted in the tenth round by the Cleveland Browns in the 1967 NFL Draft.

Copeland later served as the athletic director at the College of William & Mary, the University of Utah, the University of Virginia and Southern Methodist University (SMU).

References

1945 births
2010 deaths
American football offensive linemen
Cleveland Browns players
SMU Mustangs athletic directors
Utah Utes athletic directors
Virginia Cavaliers football players
Virginia Cavaliers athletic directors
William & Mary Tribe athletic directors
Sportspeople from Charlottesville, Virginia
Deaths from cancer in Virginia